This is a list of the Philippines' representatives and their placements at the Big Four international beauty pageants. The Philippines, widely considered a beauty pageant powerhouse, has won in all four pageants, with a total of 100 placements and 15 victories:

 Four – Miss Universe crowns (1969 • 1973 • 2015 • 2018) 
 One – Miss World crown (2013) 
 Six – Miss International crowns (1964 • 1970 • 1979 • 2005 • 2013 • 2016)
 Four – Miss Earth crowns (2008 • 2014 • 2015 • 2017)

Hundreds of beauty pageants are conducted yearly, but the Big Four are considered the most prestigious, widely covered and broadcast by media. Various news agencies collectively refer to the four major pageants as "Big Four" namely: Miss Universe, Miss World, Miss International and Miss Earth.

National franchises and organizations
The Philippine franchise holders of the four major beauty pageants are:
 Shamcey Supsup-Lee (Empire Philippines Holdings, Inc.) – Miss Universe Philippines.
 Arnold Vegafria (ALV Events International) – Miss World Philippines.
 Stella Araneta and Jorge L. Araneta (Binibining Pilipinas Charities Inc.) – Binibining Pilipinas for Miss International Philippines. 
 Ramon Monzon and Lorraine Schuck (Carousel Production) – Miss Philippines Earth.

History
The Philippines inherited the practice and promotion of beauty pageants from the Kingdom of Spain and United States which colonized the country and reflected their keen interest in pageantry through the Santero culture.

The first officially recorded beauty pageant competition in the Philippines was held in 1908 during the Manila Carnival, which organized both American and Philippine diplomatic relations, with the aim to exhibit achievements in commerce and agriculture. The winner of the competition was crowned, and came to be known, as the “Carnival Queen.” The competitions were held annually from 1908 to 1938.

In 1926, the Manila Carnival conceptualized and held the first national beauty pageant using the title Miss Philippines to represent the Philippine islands; contestants came from all over the country with the following regional titles: Miss Luzon, Miss Visayas, and Miss Mindanao. This new competition gained greater popularity, resulting in the phasing out of the “Carnival Queen” title in 1938.

National pageants
The following are national pageants which serve as qualifiers for the Big Four pageants.

Miss Universe Philippines

The Philippine representatives to the Miss Universe pageant from 1964 to 2019 were chosen by Binibining Pilipinas. Starting 2020, a separate organization has been choosing the Philippine representatives to the Miss Universe competition: the new Miss Universe Philippines Organization, with Shamcey Supsup as national director.

Binibining Pilipinas

In 1964, Binibining Pilipinas Charities Incorporated, (BPCI) headed by Stella Araneta became the official national franchise holder of the Miss Universe Organization in the Philippines, and had sent representatives to the Miss Universe pageant from 1964 to 2019. Its predecessor, the “Miss Philippines”, had been the official franchise holder from 1952 to 1963.

In 1968, the same organization acquired the Philippine franchise of Miss International, and conducted a separate pageant called "Miss Philippines" to select a representative for the Miss International competition. In 1969, BPCI started to combine the Binibining Pilipinas and Miss Philippines competitions and awarded the title "Binibining Pilipinas" to the country's representative to the Miss Universe competition, while granting the "Miss Philippines" title to the representative for the Miss International competition. For the first time in 1972, both titles "Binibining Pilipinas Universe" and "Binibining Pilipinas International" were awarded to the winners in a single competition.

Miss World Philippines

The Philippine representatives to the Miss World pageant from 1966 to 1968 were chosen by various pageant organizers.
From 1969 to 1976, the title was awarded through the Miss Republic of the Philippines, then by Mutya ng Pilipinas, Inc. through Mutya ng Pilipinas pageant from 1977 to 1991, and Binibining Pilipinas Charities, Inc., through the Binibining Pilipinas pageant from 1992 to 2010. In 2011, the Miss World Philippines organization was held by Cory Quirino's CQ Global Quest until 2016. From 2017 onwards, the Miss World Philippines is under the management of Arnold Vegafria's ALV Talent Circuit.

Miss Philippines Earth

The Miss Philippines Earth was founded in 2001 by Carousel Productions headed by its President Ramon Monzon who is also the president, CEO, and director of the Philippine Stock Exchange and chairman of the PSE Foundation, Inc. and spearheaded by Ramon's wife Lorraine Schuck as executive vice president and Peachy Veneracion as the vice president and project director.

Carousel Productions established Miss Philippines Earth as a beauty pageant competition with the aim of actively promoting the protection and preservation of the environment. Consequently, Miss Philippines (currently called Miss Philippines Earth; not related to the defunct “Miss Philippines” of 1926) was created.

Participation in international pageant competitions
From Venus Raj's participation at Miss Universe 2010 (marking the Philippines' first semifinal placement at the pageant in the 21st century and since Miriam Quiambao placed second to Botswana at Miss Universe 1999) to Beatrice Gomez's stint at Miss Universe 2021, the country placed in the Miss Universe semifinals each year, scoring 2 Top 10 placements in 2014 and 2017, 2 Top 5/6 placements in 2016 and 2021, 4 consecutive runner-up finishes in the Top 5 from 2010 to 2013, and 2 crowns in 2015 and 2018. As a result, the Philippines is the country from the Eastern Hemisphere with the longest overall streak of Miss Universe semifinal appearances (and third overall by any country in the world), totaling 12 consecutive years. It is also the first country in the world to place non-stop at Miss Universe semifinals for at least a full decade beginning any year of the 21st century.

From 2010 to 2019, the Philippines has only unplaced twice in each of the Miss World, Miss International and Miss Earth competitions, and has won an additional 6 crowns from these pageants alone, making it the country with the single most successful decade in terms of Big Four beauty pageant results in the world. Since 2010, the Philippines has gained worldwide attention for its pageant training mechanisms.

World's longest winning streak: 2013 to 2018

The Philippines currently holds the world's longest winning streak in the Big Four pageants by any country in history, from 2013 to 2018. The country's winning streak started in 2013 with Megan Young as the country's first ever, and currently only, Miss World titleholder and Bea Santiago winning the Miss International crown. Jamie Herrell then won the Miss Earth 2014 crown. Angelia Ong garnered for the Philippines the first, and so far only, back-to-back victory in Miss Earth history by clinching the 2015 crown. In the same year, Pia Wurtzbach won the Miss Universe 2015 crown for the Philippines. 

The streak continued in 2016 when Kylie Verzosa then clinched the Philippines' sixth, and most recent, Miss International crown. The following year in 2017, Karen Ibasco won for the country its fourth, and most recent, Miss Earth crown – the most by any country in that pageant's history. Culminating this six-year winning streak is Catriona Gray's victory at Miss Universe 2018, claiming the Philippines' fourth, and most recent, Miss Universe crown. The Philippines is, to date, the only country in the world to win all of the Big Four pageants in any of their titles streak.

Summary
The following table details the placing of the Philippines' representatives in the Big Four pageants.
Color Key

× Did not compete
↑ No pageant held

Placements

Hosting
The Philippines first hosted its major international pageant in 1974 for Miss Universe. It has also hosted Miss Earth several times, as the pageant originated in the country.

List of crossovers
Crossover winners of a national pageant wins in another major national pageant and then participate in the line of international beauty pageants.

Carlene Aguilar – was the first crossover candidate to accomplish this feat. Aguilar initially won Miss Philippines Earth 2001 and later won title Binibining Pilipinas World in Binibining Pilipinas 2005. She became the first Filipina to win two major national crowns in Philippine pageantry. She placed in the Top 10 in the Miss Earth 2001 and in the Top 15 in the Miss World 2005 pageant.
Catriona Gray – became the second crossover candidate who initially won Miss World Philippines 2016 and later Miss Universe Philippines 2018. Gray competed internationally and finished in the Top 5 at the Miss World 2016 competition held in Washington, D.C. and eventually won as the 67th Miss Universe in 2018 in Thailand.
Celeste Cortesi – became the third crossover candidate, winning Miss Earth Philippines 2018 and later Miss Universe Philippines 2022. She competed at Miss Earth 2018, where she finished in the Top 8, and later competed at Miss Universe 2022, where she ultimately failed to advance to the Top 16 semifinals.

References

External links

Nations at beauty pageants